The following is a list of Mexican-American writers.

A-C

Oscar Zeta Acosta
José Acosta Torres, author of collection Cachito Mía (1973)
Rodolfo Acuña
Ricardo Aguilar, author of short story collection Madreselvas en flor (1987)
Justo S. Alarcón, Spanish author of stories about Chicanos, Chulifeas fronteras (1981)
Kathleen Alcala
Alurista
Rudolfo Anaya, author of children's book Bless Me, Ultima
Gloria E. Anzaldúa, author of Borderlands/La Frontera: The New Mestiza and co-author of This Bridge Called My Back: Writings by Radical Women of Color
Ron Arias
Jimmy Santiago Baca, author and poet
Raymond Barrio, author of The Plum Plum Pickers (1969)
Irene Beltrán Hernández, author of Across the Great River (1989)
Aristeo Brito, author of El diablo en Texas (The Devil in Texas, bilingual ed. 1991)
José Antonio Burciaga
Nash Candelaria
Daniel Cano, author of Pepe Ríos (1991)
Norma Elia Cantú
Celso A. de Casas, author of Pelón Drops Out (1979)
Ana Castillo, author of So Far from God
Rafael C. Castillo
Lorna Dee Cervantes
Angelico Chavez
Denise Chávez, an author and playwright
Sandra Cisneros
Lucha Corpi, author of Delia's Song (1988)
Margarita Cota-Cárdenas, author of Puppet: A Chicano Novella (in Spanish; 1985)

D-J

 Alicia Gaspar de Alba, author of Desert Blood
Adina Emilia De Zavala
Lorenzo de Zavala
Abelardo Delgado, author of Letters to Louise (1982)
Mike Durán, author of Don't Split on My Corner (1991)
Sergio Elizondo, author of story collection Rosa, la flauta (1980) and the novels Muerte en una estrella (1987) and Suruma (1991)
Roberta Fernández
Fernando A. Flores, author of Death to the Bullshit Artists of South Texas, Vol.1 (2014) 
Gregory Thomas Garcia
Lionel G. Garcia, author of Leaving Home (1985), A Shroud in the Family (1987), Hardscrub (1989), Brush Country (2004), The Day They Took My Uncle and Other Stories, and
Julian S. Garcia
José L. Garza, author of collection Writing and Art (1989)
Xavier Garza
Diana Gabaldon
Dagoberto Gilb
Laurence Gonzáles, author of Jambeaux (1979), The Last Deal (1981), and El Vago (1983)
Rodolfo Gonzales
Genaro González, author of Rainbow's End (1988) and the story collection Only Sons (1991)
Jovita González Mireles, author of Caballero: A Historical Novel
Rigoberto González
 Stephanie Elizondo Griest
José Ángel Gutiérrez
Jaime Hernandez
Juan Felipe Herrera
Maria Hinojosa
Rolando Hinojosa
Arturo Islas
Francisco Jiménez

K-M

Gary Keller, author of collection Tales of El Huitlacoche (1984)
Luis Leal, writer, author, and UCSB professor
Alexis Madrigal, author of "Powering the Dream" (2010)
Patricia Santos Marcantonio
Patricia Preciado Martín, author of collection Days of Plenty, Days of Want (1988)
Al Martinez, Pulitzer Prize-nominated journalist; author of Ashes in the Rain: Selected Essays (1990)
Eliud Martínez, author of Voice Haunted Journey (1991)
Elizabeth Martínez, author of 500 Years of Chicano History in Pictures (1991)
Max Martínez, author of Schooland (1988) and the collections The Adventures of the Chicano Kid and Other Stories (1982) and A Red Bikini Dream (1989)
Hugo Martínez-Serros, author of the collection The Last Laugh and Other Stories (1988)
Rubén Martínez
Bill Melendez
Maria Cristina Mena
Miguel Méndez
Jim Mendiola
Pat Mora
Cherríe Moraga, co-author of This Bridge Called My Back: Writings by Radical Women of Color and author of A Xicana Codex of Changing Consciousness
Alejandro Morales, author of Old Faces and New Wine (1981), Death of an Anglo (1988), Reto en el Paraiso (1983), The Brick People (1988), and The Rag Doll Plagues (1991)
Angela Morales, author of The Girls in My Town (2016)
Alejandro Murguía

N-R

Julian Nava
J. L. Navarro, author of the collection Blue Day on Main Street (1973)
Josefina Niggli
Daniel Olivas, author of The Courtship of María Rivera Peña, Crossing the Border: Collected Poems, and How to Date a Flying Mexican
Berta Ornelas, author of Come Down from the Mound (1975)
Sheila Ortiz Taylor, author of Spring Forward/Fall Back (1985)
Miguel Antonio Otero
Américo Paredes, author of With His Pistol in His Hand
Joe Perez
Cecile Piñeda
Mary Helen Ponce, author of The Wedding (1989) and the collection Taking Control (1987)
Estela Portillo Trambley (1936–1998), author of Trini (1986), the play The Day of the Swallows (1971) and the collection Rain of Scorpions and Other Writings (1975) for which she became the first woman to receive the Quinto Sol Literary Prize. She also held the President Chair in Creative Writing at UC Davis.
Katherine Quintana Ranck, author of Portrait of Doña Elena (1983)
Adriana E. Ramírez, author of Dead Boys (2016)
John Rechy
Nicolas Retana, author, "The Mexican Men Chronicles."
Alberto Ríos
Isabella Ríos, author of Victuum (1976)
Tomás Rivera, author of ...y no se lo tragó la tierra
Alfredo Rodríguez, author of Estas tierras (1983; Palabra Nueva prize winner)
Joe Rodríguez, author of Oddsplayer (1988)
Luis J. Rodriguez
Robert Rodriguez
Richard Rodriguez
Orlando Romero (author), author of Nambé-Year One (1976)
María Amparo Ruiz de Burton
Rudy Ruiz, author of Seven for the Revolution, The Resurrection of Fulgencio Ramirez, and Valley of Shadows
Pam Muñoz Ryan, author of Esperanza Rising
Ricardo A Bracho

S-Z

Benjamin Alire Sáenz, author of Everything Begins and Ends at the Kentucky Club
Floyd Salas
Rubén Salazar
Raúlrsalinas (Raúl R. Salinas), poet and author of Un trip through the mind jail y otras excursions (1980)
Alex Sánchez
 Erika Sánchez, author and poet
Ricardo Sánchez, author of Canto y Grito Mi Liberacion (1973, 1995), Hechizospells (1976), and Amerikan Journeys::Jornadas Americanas (1994), among other titles.
 Ricardo Sanchez, author and United States Army general
Saúl Sánchez, author of the collection Hay Plesha Lichans to di Flac (i.e., "I Pledge Allegiance to the Flag") (1977)
Hope Sandoval
 John Phillip Santos, author, journalist, and filmmaker
Danzy Senna
Shea Serrano
Michelle Serros, author of Chicana Falsa and How to Be a Chicana Role Model.
Beverly Silva, author of The Cat and Other Stories (1986)
 Adela Sloss Vento
Roberto Solis
 Octavio Solis, award-winning playwright and director
Gary Soto, author of Baseball in April: Stories and Buried Onions.
Mario Suárez
 Luis Talamantez,  poet and activist 
Joseph V. Torres-Metzgar, author of Below the Summit (1976)
Jesús Salvador Treviño
Marisela Treviño Orta
Sergio Troncoso, author of The Last Tortilla and Other Stories, From This Wicked Patch of Dust and Crossing Borders: Personal Essays
 John Trudell, musician, author, poet and Political activist 
Sabine Ulibarrí
Jorge Ulica (a.k.a. Julio G. Arce), satirist, published his Crónicas diabólicas from 1916 to 1926
Martin Guevara Urbina
Luís Alberto Urrea, author of The Devil's Highway and Nobody's Son.
Gina Valdés, author of There Are No Madmen Here (1981)
Luis Valdez
Richard Vasquez, author of Chicano (1970) and other novels
Robert Vasquez, author of At the Rainbow (1995)
Félix Varela
Alfredo Véa, Jr.
Alma Luz Villanueva
José Antonio Villarreal
Victor Villaseñor
Helena Maria Viramontes, author of Under the Feet of Jesus.
Gwendolyn Zepeda
Raquel Zepeda Fitzgerald, author of “The Eye of Osiris” and eleven other books.

See also

Chicano literature
Chicano poetry
Multi-Ethnic Literature of the United States
Before Columbus Foundation

References

External links 

Marc Zimmerman, U.S. Latino Literature: An Essay and Annotated Bibliography, MARCH/Abrazo, 1992.
Teresa McKenna, "Chicano Literature", in Redefining American Literary History, Ed. A. LaVonne Brown Ruoff and Jerry W. Ward, MLA, 1990.

External links

List
Mexican American writers